Abdullah Ejaz is a Pakistani model and television actor.

Family
Director-producer of the 1960s and 1970s, Riaz Ahmad 'Raju' was his maternal grandfather, himself being the younger brother of the character actor Allauddin. The family is of Kashmiri descent.

Career
After a modelling career, he first gained recognition as an actor by playing the cricketer-turned-politician Imran Khan in the political satire show Hum Sub Umeed Se Hain, making his debut in TV serials with Nail Polish in 2011.

Television

Awards and nominations
"Best Male Model" at the Lux Style Awards in 2006.
Nominated for Best Male Model of Year at Lux Style Awards 2011

References

Living people
Male actors from Lahore
Pakistani male models
Pakistani male television actors
Kashmiri male models
Pakistani people of Kashmiri descent
1983 births